Fife Lake is a hamlet located between Coronach and Rockglen within Rural Municipality of Poplar Valley No. 12 in south-central Saskatchewan, Canada near the border with the United States. Approximately 40 people inhabited the village of Fife Lake in 2006.

History 
Prior to January 27, 2005, Fife Lake was incorporated as a village, and was restructured as a hamlet under the jurisdiction of the RM of Poplar Valley on that date.

Demographics 

See also 
List of communities in Saskatchewan
Hamlets of Saskatchewan

References 

Designated places in Saskatchewan
Poplar Valley No. 12, Saskatchewan
Former villages in Saskatchewan
Hamlets in Saskatchewan
Populated places disestablished in 2005
Division No. 3, Saskatchewan